This is a list of cities and towns in Togo.

List

By population

Other places
Agbodrafo
Togoville

See also
Geography of Togo

References

External links

 
Togo, List of cities in
Togo
Cities